Halysidota orientalis is a moth of the family Erebidae. It was described by Walter Rothschild in 1909. It is found in Mexico, Guatemala, Costa Rica, Panama, the Antilles, Colombia, Venezuela, Ecuador, Peru, Bolivia, French Guiana, Brazil (Para, São Paulo) and possibly Chile.

The larvae have been recorded feeding on Morus alba.

References

Halysidota
Moths described in 1909